The 1989 Wheatcroft Gold Cup was the sixth round of the 1989 World Sportscar Championship season.  It took place at Donington Park, United Kingdom on 3 September 1989.

Official results
Class winners in bold.  Cars failing to complete 75% of winner's distance marked as Not Classified (NC).

† – #201 Mazdaspeed and #181 Roy Baker Racing were not classified due to completing the final lap of the race at too slow of a pace.

Statistics
 Pole position – #61 Team Sauber Mercedes – 1:19.123
 Fastest lap – #23 Nissan Motorsports International – 1:24.500
 Average speed – 162.882 km/h

References

 
 

Donington
Donington
1989